The Surrey Knights are a Junior "B" ice hockey team based in Surrey, British Columbia, Canada. They are members of the Harold Brittain Conference of the Pacific Junior Hockey League (PJHL). The Knights play their home games at the North Surrey Sport and Ice Complex.

History

The team was founded in 1999 in New Westminster as the Queen's Park Pirates, where they played their home games at the historic Queen's Park Arena until they relocating to the Sungod Arena in North Delta for the 2002–03 season, moving to North Delta, dropping the Pirates name and changing it to Flyers, to become the North Delta Flyers. The Flyers played three seasons before changing their name to Devils in 2005. The North Delta Devils relocated to the George Preston Recreation Centre in 2014, moved to Langley, dropped the Devils name and changed it to Knights, becoming the Langley Knights. On June 2, 2016, The PJHL announced the relocation of the Langley Knights to the city of Surrey in time for the 2016–17 season. This relocation happened because the Vancouver Giants relocated from the Pacific Coliseum to the Langley Events Centre, forcing the BCHL's Langley Rivermen out of their old home. They had to go to the George Preston Centre, which also forced the Knights out of Langley and into Surrey, to become the Surrey Knights.

In 2016–17, the Knights' first season in their new location, the Knights did not win a single game all season in the PJHL. The Knights' last win in the PJHL was Thursday, November 19, 2015, 3–2 win vs Abbotsford Pilots. a span of 89 games.

After a two-year winless streak, the Junior B Surrey Knights bagged a 2–0 win Friday, November 24, 2017 against the Abbotsford Pilots. Goalie Zakary Babin stood on his head, stopping 49 Abbotsford shots to get the shutout. The Knights mustered just 12 shots the other way. It would be the only win for Surrey Knights for 2017–18.

For the 2018–2019 season, The Surrey Knights would win its first 2 games. The first win came of the year on Thursday vs. expansion White Rock Whalers with a 6–5 victory on December 6, 2018. Naveen Kainth faced 59 shots, earning first star of the game. The 2nd win of the year, came on Thursday, January 24, 2019, with a 6–2 victory over the Mission City Outlaws. Naveen Kainth would face 50/52 shots and earn 1st, star of the game. It would mark the last win of the season for Knights only getting 2 wins in the 2018–19 season.

The 2019-2020, Surrey Knights moved to a new home at the North Surrey Sport & Ice Complex. They would go on to have another unsuccessful Season. Which would miss playoffs once again. But, would win only 1 regular Season game Which came on Thursday December 19/2019 V.S. Grandview Steelers with 4-1 Win.

Season-by-season record

Note: GP = Games played, W = Wins, L = Losses, OT = Overtime Losses, Shootout losses & Ties, Pts = Points, GF = Goals for, GA = Goals against

NHL alumni

Colton Gillies
Ben Maxwell
John Negrin

References

External links
Official website of the Surrey Knights
Official website of the Pacific Junior Hockey League

Pacific Junior Hockey League teams
Sport in Surrey, British Columbia
Ice hockey teams in British Columbia
Ice hockey clubs established in 1999
1999 establishments in British Columbia